America Wood is a 21.4 hectare biological Site of Special Scientific Interest on the Isle of Wight, notified in 1986. Legend has it that the name derives from the use of oak trees grown here to build ships utilised in the American War of Independence. However, the name Americas Wood appears on Andrews Map of the Island in 1769, six years before the outbreak of the War of Independence.

References

 English Nature citation sheet for the site  (accessed 5 August 2006)

External links
 English Nature (SSSI information)
 Site boundary map at English Nature's "Nature on the Map" website

Sites of Special Scientific Interest on the Isle of Wight
Sites of Special Scientific Interest notified in 1986